Poppleton is a railway station on the Harrogate Line, which runs between  and  via . It is owned by Network Rail and managed by Northern Trains.

The line is double track between Poppleton and Skelton Junction in York. West of Poppleton, the line is single track as far as Hammerton.

The station has a nursery (horticultural), which used to supply plants across the stations in Yorkshire pre-privatisation. A two-foot gauge railway still operates around the nursery.

Facilities
The main buildings here are now privately occupied and the station is unmanned. The lack of ticket machines means that tickets need to be purchased either on the train or in advance. There are shelters and digital information screens on each platform. Step-free access is available to both platforms, which are linked by the manually-operated level crossing, which still retains its wooden gates and ground-level signal box.

Services

As of the December 2021 timetable change, the station is served by a half-hourly service between Leeds and York via Harrogate, with additional services running at peak times. All services are operated by Northern Trains.

Rolling stock used: Class 158 Express Sprinter and Class 170 Turbostar

References

External links
 
 

Railway stations in North Yorkshire
DfT Category F2 stations
Railway stations in Great Britain opened in 1848
Northern franchise railway stations
Former York and North Midland Railway stations